The red-fronted antpecker (Parmoptila rubrifrons) is a species of songbird found in Western Africa. Like all antpeckers, it is tentatively placed in the estrildid finch family (Estrildidae). It often contains the eastern Jameson's antpecker (P. jamesoni) as a subspecies.

This bird inhabits tropical lowland moist forest in Sierra Leone, Liberia, Guinea, Ghana and Côte d'Ivoire. When Jameson's and the red-fronted antpeckers were still evaluated as one species, they were classified as a species of least concern by the IUCN. However, the red-fronted antpecker is declining noticeably due to habitat destruction and has entirely disappeared from Mali for example. Therefore, its status has been changed to near threatened after the taxonomic split.

Footnotes

References
 BirdLife International (BLI) (2008a) Red-fronted Antpecker Species Factsheet. Retrieved 2008-MAY-26.
 BirdLife International (BLI) (2008b): [2008 IUCN Redlist status changes]. Retrieved 2008-MAY-23.

External links
Image at the Animal Diversity Web

red-fronted antpecker
Birds of West Africa
red-fronted antpecker